Ma Qiu (died 350) was a military general of Later Zhao and Former Qin during the Sixteen Kingdoms period. Ma Qiu participated in Zhao's campaigns against Former Yan and Former Liang, in which both he met with failures. During the confusion of Shi Hu's death, he sided with Ran Min, helping in his order to exterminate the barbarians. However, he was captured by Fu Hong and executed after his attempted coup which resulted in Hong's death.

Service under Later Zhao 
Ma Qiu was from a tribal family that lived in Taiyuan Commandery, although his participation in Ran Min's ethnic cleansing of the Five Barbarians in 350 suggests that he may actually be Han Chinese. He had served Later Zhao during the time of Shi Le. He was described as a fierce and dangerous man. According to the Taiping Yulan, it was popular during his time for mothers to stop their children from crying by telling them that Ma Qiu would come for them.

Ma Qiu's earliest mentions was in 333, during Shi Hu's control over the emperor Shi Hong. Around this time, the powerful Di chieftain Pu Hong broke away from Later Zhao. Shi Hu sent Ma Qiu to subdue him, but Pu Hong immediately surrendered without a fight. Shi Hu valued Pu Hong's influence over the Di, so he did not punish but rather rewarded him.

War with Former Yan 
Ma Qiu was involved in the joint Later Zhao and Former Yan campaign against the Duan tribe in 338. Ma Qiu and Guo Tai (郭太) pursued the tribe's leader, Duan Liao to Mount Miyun, capturing his mother and wife and slaughtering his troops. The Duan tribe was on the verge of collapsing but by this point, Shi Hu had realized that Yan was not interested in letting Zhao benefit from the war. Shi Hu ordered Ma Qiu to retrieve Duan Liao, who had offered his surrender at Mount Miyun. The Yan general Murong Ke ambushed Ma Qiu at Sanzangkou (三藏口, in present-day Chengde, Hebei), leaving three-fifths of his army dead. Ma Qiu returned on foot to an angered Shi Hu, who stripped him off his titles and offices.

War with Former Liang 
Ma Qiu returned to prominence in 346, now serving as Inspector of Liangzhou. Shi Hu wanted to conquer the Former Liang state and had Ma Qiu attack Jincheng with Sun Fudu (孫伏都). The Administrator of Jincheng, Zhang Chong (張沖) had offered to surrender to Ma Qiu so Liang's Duke, Zhang Chonghua responded by sending Xie Ai to repel the invaders. Ma Qiu conquered Jincheng, where the Prefect Che Ji (車濟) refused to surrender to him and committed suicide. He then conquered Daxia after Liang's general Liang Shi (梁式) arrested its Administrator Song Yan (宋晏) and handed over the city. Song Yan was forcefully ordered to write a letter to the Commandant of Wanshu (宛戍, in present-day Guanghe, Gansu), Song Ju (宋矩) convincing him to surrender, but Song Ju refused. Instead, he decided to kill his own wife and children before taking his own life. Ma Qiu was impressed by the displays of loyalty from Che Ji and Song Ju, so he had them both buried with proper burial. 

Ma Qiu continued his advances into Liang the following year in 347 by attacking Fuhan (枹罕, in present-day Linxia County, Gansu). Although he completely surrounded the city, the defences were sturdy. He used siege ladders and tunnels to breach their defenses but all these failed while getting thousands of his men killed. Zhao's general Liu Hun (劉渾) came to reinforce Ma Qiu but Liang's general Zhang Qu (張璩) arrived and viciously attacked the Zhao forces. Ma Qiu abandoned the siege and retreated to Daxia.

Shi Ning was sent in to further reinforce Ma Qiu. Xie Ai went to face Ma Qiu's army, riding a light carriage, wearing a white headdress and having drums played as he proceeded. Ma Qiu saw him foolish-looking and thought he was mocking him, so he sent his cavalries to fight him. However, Xie Ai refused to move, which makes the cavalries suspect an ambush, so they did not move further. With the cavalries away, a Liang army led by Zhang Mao attacked Ma Qiu's camp. The Zhao army scattered and Xie Ai joined in the fight. Ma Qiu was badly routed and fled alone on horseback to Daxia. 

Ma Qiu returned with Shi Ning (石寧) and captured Fuhan before proceeding to Henei. He was further reinforced by Sun Fudu and Liu Hun and attacked Zhang Chonghua. Xie Ai marched south-west, defeating Wang Zhuo before fighting Ma Qiu again. Ma was defeated once more and fled to Jincheng, much to Shi Hu's frustration. Despite Liang fending off the invasion, Ma Qiu ended up winning the last battle between the two sides as he defeated Zhang Mao. Because of this, a Liang general named Li Kui (李逵) surrendered to him along with thousands of Di and Qiang living south of the Yellow River.

During the confusion following Shi Hu's death 
Shi Hu passed away in 349, succeeded by his son Shi Shi. However, his brother Shi Zun overthrew him and started a series of four short-lived emperors in Zhao between 349 and 351. During Shi Shi and Shi Zun's reigns, Ma Qiu appears to a remained neutral. In 349, he repelled an invasion by Jin's Inspector of Liángzhou Sima Xun. The situation in Zhao worsened in 350 when Shi Hu's adopted grandson Ran Min broke away and established his state of Wei. While Ma Qiu marched to Luoyang together with Wang Lang, he received Ran Min's order to execute any living barbarian in sight. Ma Qiu complied and had many of Wang Lang's barbarian troops executed, causing Wang to flee. 

Ma Qiu then marched to Yecheng to meet with Ran Min. However, he was intercepted by Pu Hong's son, Pu Xiong and captured. Pu Hong decided to make Ma Qiu his General Who Directs the Army. Later that year, Pu Hong declared himself King of the Three Qin and change his surname to Fu. Ma Qiu advised Fu Hong to concentrate in conquering Guanzhong while Ran Min and Shi Zhi were at war. Fu Hong agreed but Ma Qiu was not as loyal as he thought. At a feast, Ma Qiu took the chance to poison Fu Hong and took over his army. Unfortunately for him, though Fu Hong was poisoned, he did not get far with his plans, as Ma Qiu was quickly arrested and executed by Fu Hong's son, Fu Jian.

Legend of Magu 
In Chinese mythology, Magu is a female Taoist deity associated with the elixir of life. In some iterations of her, Ma Qiu is portrayed as her father. The most notable works that do this are the Complete Biographies of the Immortals (列仙全傳), written by the Ming dynasty author, Wang Shizhen and the Secret Collection of Jianhu (堅瓠秘集), written by the Qing dynasty author, Chu Renhuo. 

In these works, Ma Qiu retains his fierce demeanour from history. He was put in charge of building fortifications and forced his workers to work day and night. They are only allowed to rest once they hear the cock's crow at dawn. Magu took pity on the workers, so she mimics the sound of a cock to give the workers earlier rests by crowing at an earlier hour. However, Ma Qiu soon found out and wanted to apprehend his daughter for this, but by then, she had fled to the mountains to pursue the Taoist arts.

References 

 Fang, Xuanling (ed.) (648). Book of Jin (Jin Shu).
 Sima, Guang (1084). Zizhi Tongjian.

350 deaths
Later Zhao generals
Former Qin generals